The Federal College of Education, Pankshin is a federal government higher education institution located in Pankshin, Plateau State, Nigeria. It is affiliated to University of Jos for its degree programmes. The current Provost is Amos Bulus Cirfat.

History 
The Federal College of Education, Pankshin was established in 1974. It was originally known as Federal Advanced Teachers College (FATC) but was later named Federal College of Education, Pankshin.

Library

Courses 
The institution offers the following courses;

 Biology
 Computer Education
 Chemistry Education
 Business Education
 Agricultural Science
 Arabic 
 Christian Religious Studies
 Adult Education
 Early Childhood Care Education

Affiliation 
The institution is affiliated with the University of Jos to offer programmes leading to Bachelor of Education, (B.Ed.) in;

 Computer Science	 
 Fine and Applied Arts
 Agricultural Science
 Music
 Religious Studies
 Business Education
 Biology
 Technical Education
 French
 Guidance and Counselling
 Arabic
 Special Education
 Social Studies
 Educational Planning and Administration
 English Language
 Primary Education Studies
 Adult Education
 Home Economics
 Physics
 Physics and Health Education
 Integrated Science
 Mathematics
 Chemistry

References

Federal colleges of education in Nigeria
1974 establishments in Nigeria
Plateau State
Educational institutions established in 1974